KXLF-TV (channel 4) is a television station in Butte, Montana, United States, affiliated with CBS and The CW Plus. Owned by the E. W. Scripps Company, it is part of the Montana Television Network, a statewide network of CBS-affiliated stations. KXLF-TV's studios are located on South Montana Street in downtown Butte, and its transmitter is located on XL Heights east of the city.

KXLF-TV operates a semi-satellite in Bozeman, KBZK (channel 7), with studios on Television Way in Bozeman and transmitter atop High Flat, southwest of Four Corners.

KXLF-TV acts as a central hub for all MTN stations across Montana. The station operates its programming and commercials with an automated playout system and video servers. Programming and commercials are microwaved from Butte to Bozeman's KBZK. All MTN stations are connected via microwave radio, with KXLF and XL Heights being the central location where all data is routed.

History
KXLF-TV was founded on August 14, 1953. It is Montana's oldest television station, and was originally owned by Television Montana, a company largely owned by industry pioneer Ed Craney; it was a sister station to KXLF radio (AM 1370, now KXTL). At the outset, the station operated on channel 6 as a primary NBC affiliate, with some DuMont programming. The NBC affiliation matched its radio sister, which was part of the "Z-Bar Network," a regional Pacific Northwest radio network based in Portland and including affiliates in Spokane, Helena, Great Falls, Missoula, and Bozeman. KXLF added ABC programming in 1955; soon afterward, the station lost DuMont when it shut down.

KXLF-TV's first home was the second floor of a Pay 'n Save food and drug store in downtown Butte along with KXLF radio. However, the studio soon suffered heavy damages because of a burglary to the grocery store downstairs. The burglars cut a hole in the floor of the studio and used the studio camera cable to climb down and gain access to the grocery store. A few months later, the cable was replaced and the studio was up and running for good.

In addition to network programming, in its early years KXLF-TV aired a number of local programs, all of which was produced live in the studio, including shows and commercials. Some of Butte's local shows in the 1950s were The Oldtimer, featuring John Diz, This Afternoon with You, hosted by Darien Carkeet, What's New? hosted by Ed Craney and KXLF the Clown, featuring Wes Haugen, and Shadow Stumpers where viewers called in to identify what object's shadow was on TV.

KXLF-TV moved to channel 4 in October 1956 due to concerns that the concurrent operation of channel 6 stations in Butte and Pocatello would result in interference (channel 4 had previously been used in Butte by KOPR-TV from 1953 to 1954, while channel 6 would return to the air in Butte as KTVM in 1970). The following year was a time of change for the station. A complicated operation saw the transmitter moved on top of a mountain east of Butte, subsequently dubbed XL Heights. The transmitter tower was directly positioned on the Continental Divide, thereby giving the station the moniker "The Continental Divide Station". The new transmitter location made an off-air signal available for KXLJ-TV in Helena (now KTVH-DT) creating the first TV "network" in Montana. Also in 1957, KXLF found a permanent home in the former Chicago, Milwaukee, St. Paul and Pacific Railroad station on Montana Street. The station was built in 1916 and features a  clock tower. In the 1970s, the depot became one of Butte's first major restoration projects. It continues to serve as an example of historic restoration. In the late 1990s, KXLF installed a live webcam atop the clock tower, which offers a live view of downtown Butte.

In 1958, KXLF-TV and KXLJ-TV, in association with KFBB-TV in Great Falls, KOOK-TV in Billings (now KTVQ), KID-TV in Idaho Falls, Idaho (now KIDK), and KLIX-TV in Twin Falls, Idaho (now KMVT), formed the Skyline Network. KFBB was later replaced by Great Falls' other station, KRTV. Later that year, the station added a secondary affiliation with CBS; by 1960, CBS was the station's primary network, though NBC was retained on a secondary basis. That year, Craney sold KXLF-AM-TV, along with KXLJ-AM-TV in Helena, to Joe Sample, president of Garryowen Corporation and owner of KOOK-TV, for over $1 million—earning a handsome return on his original investment in KXLF radio in 1929. Sample immediately spun the KXLJ stations off to Helena TV, a local cable TV company; KXLJ-TV (which was renamed KBLL-TV) eventually severed its ties with KXLF and left the Skyline Network.

In March 1966, the Federal Communications Commission (FCC) merged Butte and Missoula into a single television market. KXLF-TV became the CBS affiliate for the merged market; it kept the secondary ABC affiliation but lost NBC to KGVO-TV (now KECI-TV). The Skyline Network shut down on September 30, 1969, after various ownership and affiliation changes at its stations made it difficult for the network to continue operating. The following month, Sample started the Montana Television Network, composed of KXLF-TV, KOOK-TV, and KRTV. In 1970, Sample expanded his Montana network by building KPAX-TV in Missoula, which operated as a semi-satellite of KXLF for several years. KXLF, along with KPAX, became primary ABC affiliates on August 30, 1976; CBS programming was then split between KXLF/KPAX and KGVO-TV/KTVM. This made KXLF one of the few stations to have been a primary affiliate of each of the Big Three television networks.

In 1984, Sample sold the MTN stations to SJL, Inc. for $20 million; KXLF radio was concurrently sold to separate interests. That year, KXLF-TV returned to a primary CBS affiliation; it continued to air ABC in the off-hours (shared with KTVM) until the early 1990s. SJL sold KXLF, KPAX-TV, and KRTV to Evening Post Publishing Company, through its Cordillera Communications subsidiary, for $24 million in 1986.

In 1995, KXLF launched a low-power repeater in Helena, K25EJ (channel 25); on August 22, 2000, that station changed its call letters to KXLH-LP. In 2005, KXLH's operating responsibilities were transferred to sister station KRTV; it now operates as KXLH-LD (channel 9). During the early 2000s, KXLF-TV had a secondary affiliation with UPN; the network shut down in 2006 as part of the formation of The CW, which is seen on a digital subchannel of KXLF and KBZK. After the DTV conversion on June 12, 2009, KXLF was one of more than 10 stations asking for a power increase because of the problems with VHF digital signals, particularly VHF-LO frequencies.

In 1993, Evening Post acquired Bozeman station KCTZ, a separate ABC affiliate associated with KSVI of Billings, and made it a satellite of KXLF-TV; two Cordillera-owned translators, K26DE (channel 26) in Bozeman and K43DU (channel 43) in Butte, then began carrying most of KSVI's programming (including ABC programming), as well as local Bozeman newscasts produced by Cordillera. After KWYB (channel 18) signed on in September 1996 and took the ABC affiliation in the Butte-Bozeman market, K43DU was taken off-the-air (the repeater was sold to Montana State University in 2001 and now carries Montana PBS); on October 31, after K26DE's ABC affiliation ended in advance of the launch of KWYB repeater K28FB (channel 28, now KWYB-LD), KCTZ became a Fox affiliate, and channel 26 became a repeater of KXLF. During this time, channel 7 also took on a secondary affiliation with UPN.

KCTZ dropped Fox on August 21, 2000, saying that the network usually generated lower ratings than the Big Three networks in smaller markets. At that point, the station once again became a satellite of KXLF-TV (though with separate advertising) and changed its call letters to KBZK-TV (the "-TV" suffix was dropped eight days later). Area cable systems then picked up Foxnet for Fox programming after an unsuccessful attempt to pipe in KHMT from Billings; the Butte–Bozeman market would not get another Fox affiliate until KBTZ (channel 24) signed on in 2003.

News operation
KXLF's newscasts at 5:30 p.m. and 10:00 p.m. have long dominated the market, in no small part because they are the only local newscasts in the area. In addition to local news, KXLF produces a noon news segment.

KCTZ produced local Bozeman newscasts while owned by Big Horn Communications; after the station was sold to Cordillera Communications, these newscasts were broadcast on K26DE. Local news returned to KCTZ after the switch to Fox in 1996; however, after channel 7 became KBZK in 2000, the newscasts were canceled and replaced with simulcasts of KXLF's newscasts, retaining a small newsroom in Bozeman to cover stories from the area. In 2007, KBZK returned to producing a separate newscast from its studios in Bozeman.

Current news staff
Donna Kelley – weeknights at 5:30; also executive producer

Notable former on-air staff
Cara Capuano, sports reporter now back with ESPN (previously with FSN).
Stella Inger, Emmy nominated reporter
Pat Kearney (1955–2014), reporter, anchor and news director during his tenure (1981–88), turned local author and historian

Technical information

Subchannels
The stations' digital signals are multiplexed:

Translators

References

External links

Montana CW

Montana Television Network
CBS network affiliates
The CW affiliates
Grit (TV network) affiliates
Ion Television affiliates
Court TV affiliates
Television channels and stations established in 1953
1953 establishments in Montana
XLF-TV
E. W. Scripps Company television stations